Železnice is a town in Jičín District in the Hradec Králové Region of the Czech Republic. It has about 1,300 inhabitants. The historic town centre is well preserved and is protected by law as an urban monument zone.

Administrative parts
Villages of Březka, Cidlina, Doubravice, Pekloves, Těšín and Zámezí are administrative parts of Železnice.

Geography
It lies mostly in the Jičín Uplands. The Cidlina River flows through the rural part of the territory. There are several small ponds around the town.

History
The first written mention of Železnice is from 1318. In 1514, it was referred to as a market town, and probably in 1599, it was promoted to a town. In 1788 and 1826, the town was badly damaged by large fires. In 1903, the railway through Železnice was built.

Transport
Železnice lies on the railway line Hradec Králové–Turnov.

Sights

After the fire in 1826, the town buildings in the historic centre were restored in a unified Neoclassical style. This buildings has mostly been preserved to this day and forms a unique urban complex. The town hall was built in 1826.

The Church of Saint Giles was built on the site of an old Romanesque church from the 13th century after it was destroyed during the Thirty Years' War, and rebuilt in the Baroque style in 1727–1739.

Notable people
Tavík František Šimon (1877–1942), painter, etcher and woodcutter

Twin towns – sister cities

Železnice is twinned with:
 Revò, Italy

References

External links

Cities and towns in the Czech Republic